John Henry Tilden (January 21, 1851 – September 1, 1940) was an American physician best known in circles of alternative healthcare for his criticism of pharmaceutics and for his theory explaining disease via "toxaemia".

Career

Tilden was born in Van Burensburg, Illinois, on January 21, 1851.  He began studying medicine under the supervision of his father, Joseph G Tilden MD.  At age 17, the younger Tilden joined the medical office of J. Fellows, of Nokomis, Illinois, and studied medicine another two years.  In 1872, Tilden graduated from the Eclectic Medical Institute of Cincinnati, and practiced in Nokomis for eight years.  Meanwhile, in 1877, he took a post-graduate course at the American Medical College at St. Louis, Missouri.

In 1879, Tilden moved to St. Louis, and, at the college, lectured in anatomy and physiology for two years. In 1881, he moved to Litchfield, Illinois, where, practicing four years, he "established a fine reputation."  In June 1882, he was elected Adjunct Professor of Anatomy in St. Louis. In 1886, Tilden moved to Wichita, Kansas, where he drew acclaim, and in 1890, moved to Denver, Colorado. In 1916, he established the Tilden School for Teaching Health as a private residential teaching institution and sanitarium where he offered patients his alternative to the standard medical practices of the day.

Personal life

In 1873, Tilden married Rebecca Maddux, a native of Hillsboro, Illinois, and daughter of Nathaniel Maddux. They had two children, a daughter, Edna, born in 1876, and Elsie, born in 1878 (who died in 1884).  Tilden was "a prominent member of the National Eclectic Medical Society, and also of the State Medical Society, of Illinois."

He died in Denver, Colorado, on September 1, 1940, at age 89.

Healthcare views

Early in practice, doubting drug treatment, Tilden began favoring preventive healthcare.  In this interest, he began publishing a monthly magazine, The Stuffed Club, in 1900.  It was renamed The Philosophy of Health in 1915, and renamed Health Review and Critique in 1926.  Also in 1926, Tilden published the book Toxaemia Explained: The True Interpretation of the Cause of Disease.  Years later, Henry Bieler mentioned Tilden as one of his own influences.

Criticism

Tilden's claims that all diseases are the result of "toxaemia" are regarded as quackery by medical experts. He was described as a food faddist and quack by the American Medical Association.

Harriet A. Hall has written that:

"Tilden did no experiments. He “thought” about disease and came up with a hypothesis: enervating habits allow toxic metabolic waste products to accumulate in the body, and this is the one cause of all disease. Then he proceeded to advise people about health without doing any kind of testing to determine whether his hypothesis was true or false, or whether following his recommendations really made a difference. It is all speculation, and the facts it is based on are largely pre-scientific errors and distortions. It was not entirely unreasonable for him to think that way in 1926, but his ideas have been completely superseded by 8 decades of advances in microbiology, genetics, histology, immunology, physiology, and other disciplines."

Bibliography 

 Criticisms of the Practice of Medicine, (1910)
 Cholera Infantum (1909)
 Epilepsy (1918)
 Typhoid Fever (1909)
 Diseases Of Women and Easy Childbirth (1912)
 Gonorrhea and Syphilis (1912)
 Food: Its Influence as a Factor in Disease and Health (1914)
 Appendicitis (1921)
 Care of Children (1920)
 Impaired Health I (1921)
 Impaired Health II (1921)
 Food I - Its Composition, Preparation, Combination, and Effects, with Appendix on Cooking (1914)
 Food II - Its Influence as a Factor in Disease and Health (1916)
 ''Pocket Dietitian (1925)
 Toxaemia Explained: The True Interpretation of the Cause of Disease (1926)

References

External links 
 
 

1851 births
1940 deaths
Physicians from Kansas
Pseudoscientific diet advocates